Andrei Karatchenia (born 1 January 1989) is a former professional tennis player from Belarus.

Biography
A right-handed player from Minsk, Karatchenia debuted for the Belarus Davis Cup team as a 15 year old in 2004. Belarus had reached the World Group semi-finals for the first time and faced the United States in Charleston. Having already lost the tie, the Belarusians played Karatchenia against Mardy Fish in the last of the reverse singles, but the match was abandoned three games in due to rain.

Karatchenia partnered with Thomas Fabbiano to win the boys' doubles championship at the 2007 French Open, beating Kellen Damico and Jonathan Eysseric in the final. His professional career was limited to Futures tournaments and he won a total of three ITF doubles titles.

In both 2007 and 2008 he appeared in four further Davis Cup ties for Belarus. He had singles wins over Jerzy Janowicz of Poland and Georgia's Irakli Labadze in 2008.

Junior grand slam finals

Doubles: 1 (1 title)

ATP Challenger and ITF Futures finals

Singles: 1 (0–1)

Doubles: 4 (3–1)

See also
List of Belarus Davis Cup team representatives

References

External links
 
 
 

1989 births
Living people
Belarusian male tennis players
French Open junior champions
Tennis players from Minsk
Grand Slam (tennis) champions in boys' doubles
21st-century Belarusian people